is a railway station located in Kashihara, Nara, Japan.

The station was named after Oka-dera, a Buddhist temple located east of the station. However, the temple recommends visitors use Kashiharajingū-mae Station for bus connections since there is no public transit service from Okadera Station to it.

Lines 
 Kintetsu Railway
 Yoshino Line

Surrounding Area

Platforms and tracks 
The station has  two side platforms and two tracks

External links

References

Railway stations in Japan opened in 1923
Stations of Kintetsu Railway
Railway stations in Nara Prefecture